Dmitry Mikhaylovich Lepikov (born 21 April 1972) is a retired Russian freestyle swimmer.

He had his best achievements in the 4 × 200 m freestyle relay. In this event he won a gold medal at the 1992 Summer Olympics, setting a new world record, and two European gold medals in 1991 and 1993.

References

1972 births
Living people
Soviet male swimmers
Olympic swimmers of the Unified Team
Swimmers at the 1992 Summer Olympics
Olympic gold medalists for the Unified Team
Swimmers from Saint Petersburg
World record setters in swimming
Russian male freestyle swimmers
European Aquatics Championships medalists in swimming
Medalists at the 1992 Summer Olympics
Olympic gold medalists in swimming